Patricia Shevlin  (born August 24, 1949) was the executive producer of CBS Evening News from May 2011 until April 2014 when she moved to CBS's 60 Minutes. Before her tenure at Evening News she worked as the executive producer on the weekend edition of the program from 2000. She started at CBS in 1973. Along with colleague Miles Doran, Shevlin produced Voices of the Lost, the story of the disappearance of cargo ship El Faro, including recovered audio from the ship's last 26 hours.

References 

American television producers
American women television producers
1949 births
Living people
21st-century American women
60 Minutes producers